Cieszyn may refer to the following places:

 Cieszyn, a town in Silesian Voivodeship, Poland
 Český Těšín (Czeski Cieszyn), a town in Moravian-Silesian Region, Czech Republic

 Cieszyn, Greater Poland Voivodeship, a village in Greater Poland Voivodeship, Poland
 Cieszyn, Lublin Voivodeship, a village in Lublin Voivodeship, Poland
 Cieszyn, West Pomeranian Voivodeship, a village in West Pomeranian Voivodeship, Poland